Phobaeticus chani or Chan's megastick, also known by its synonym Sadyattes chani, is a species of stick insect in the tribe Pharnaciini. It is one of the longest insects in the world and was once considered the record-holder (it is currently held by an unnamed species of Phryganistria discovered in 2016). One specimen held in the Natural History Museum in London measures . This measurement is, however, with the front legs fully extended. The body alone still measures an impressive .

It is named after amateur Malaysian naturalist Datuk Chan Chew Lun.

Phobaeticus chani was selected as one of "The Top 10 New Species" described in 2008 by the International Institute for Species Exploration at Arizona State University and an international committee of taxonomists.  The species was also listed as one of the top 10 discoveries of the decade in the BBC television documentary Decade of Discovery, first broadcast on December 14, 2010.

See also 

 List of largest insects

References

External links
Phasmid Study Group: Phobaeticus chani
Image of insect

Phasmatidae
Insects of Indonesia
Insects of Malaysia
Insects described in 2008
Phasmatodea of Malesia